The Old Mauch Chunk Historic District is a national historic district located at Jim Thorpe, Carbon County, Pennsylvania.

The district includes 28 contributing buildings in the central business district of Jim Thorpe. It includes residential and commercial buildings in a number of popular architectural styles including Italianate.  The original town was laid out in 1831 by noted civil engineer John A. Roebling. Notable buildings include the I.O.O.F. Hall (1844), Lehigh Coal and Navigation Building (1882), Jim Thorpe National Bank (1870s), Carbon County Courthouse (1894), Dimmick Memorial Library (1889), Capitol Theater (Mauch Chunk Opera House) (1882), 1855 School, Weiksner's Taproom (1860s), "Stone Row," Webster House, New American Hotel, and Hooven Mercantile Building.  Located in the district and listed separately are the Asa Packer Mansion, Harry Packer Mansion, Carbon County Jail, Central Railroad of New Jersey Station, and St. Mark's Episcopal Church.

It was listed on the National Register of Historic Places in 1977.

References

External links
 St. Mark's Episcopal Church, Race Street, Jim Thorpe, Carbon County, PA: 2 photos and 1 photo caption page, at Historic American Buildings Survey
 Stone Row (Houses), 25-55 Race Street, Jim Thorpe, Carbon County, PA: 2 photos, 2 data pages, and 1 photo caption page, at Historic American Buildings Survey
 Dimmick Memorial Library, Jim Thorpe, Carbon County, PA: 1 photo and 1 photo caption page, at Historic American Buildings Survey
 Lehigh Coal & Navigation Building, Susquehanna Street at Courthouse Square, Jim Thorpe, Carbon County, PA: 3 photos, 2 data pages, and 1 photo caption page, at Historic American Buildings Survey
 Central Railroad of New Jersey, Jim Thorpe Station, Jim Thorpe, Carbon County, PA: 1 photo and 1 photo caption page, at Historic American Buildings Survey
 Courthouse Square, Jim Thorpe, Carbon County, PA: 2 photos and 1 photo caption page, at Historic American Buildings Survey
 Asa Packer Mansion, Packer Hill, Jim Thorpe, Carbon County, PA: 15 measured drawings at Historic American Buildings Survey

Historic American Buildings Survey in Pennsylvania
Historic districts on the National Register of Historic Places in Pennsylvania
Italianate architecture in Pennsylvania
Buildings and structures in Carbon County, Pennsylvania
National Register of Historic Places in Carbon County, Pennsylvania